Lovers in Paris is a 2009 Philippine television drama series loosely based on the 2004 South Korean drama series of the same title. The series was aired on ABS-CBN's Primetime Bida evening block from September 28 to December 11, 2009, replacing Tayong Dalawa.

Premise
A story of three people will discover the complexities of love. For Vivian, love is the greatest thing to give and to receive. For Carlo, love is but a responsibility. For Martin, love is self-gratification. Despite their different views, these three will learn go through a life-changing experience when their paths cross in Paris.

Cast and characters

Main cast
 KC Concepcion as Vivian Vizcarra
 Piolo Pascual as Carlo Aranaz
 Zanjoe Marudo as Martin Aranaz Barrameda

Supporting cast
 Christopher de Leon as George Aranaz
 Mark Gil as John Palma
 Maricar Reyes as Karen Roxas
 Assunta De Rossi as Eunice Gatus
 Rachel Anne Wolfe as Louise Aranaz Barrameda

Extended cast
 K Brosas as Michelle
 Hyubs Azarcon as Joon
 Ching Arellano as Popoy
 Aaron Junatas as Keon
 Maria Isabel Lopez as Julia Francisco-Gatus
 Matthew Aquino as Alex Gatus
 Savannah Lamsen as Innah Fernandez
 Dionne Monsanto as Jennifer
 Daisy Cariño as Carla
 Manuel Chua as Albert Samaniego
 Zaira dela Peña as Carlene

Guest cast
 Sophia Baars as young Vivian
 Joshua Dionisio as young Carlo
 Jairus Aquino as young Martin
 Soliman Cruz as McArthur "Mac" Vizcarra
 Melissa Mendez as Rowena Vizcarra
 Alwyn Uytingco as Dennis Mariano
 Jubail Andres as bartender
 Digna Roosevelt as Bridge
 Kevin Viard as hotel owner
 Marvin Raymundo as bartender
 John Tagle as Mr. Loxen
 Daniel Revilla as Renzo Barrameda
 JC Lourry Navarro as friend of young Carlo

Production
Lovers in Paris is a Korean drama produced by Seoul Broadcasting System in 2004, starring Kim Jung-eun, Park Shin-yang and Lee Dong-gun. ABS-CBN dubbed the series in Filipino and was aired on the network from November 2004 to January 2005.

The Philippine adaptation of Lovers in Paris marked the first primetime television project for KC Concepcion and her first pairing with Piolo Pascual. Principal photography began during the first quarter of 2009 in Paris, France. Filming for the series concluded in the Philippines on December 3, 2009.

Pilot week marathon
On October 3, 2009, ABS-CBN aired a special encore marathon of the first few episodes of Lovers in Paris due to public demand. Viewers in several areas were unable to watch the premiere week because of electricity outages caused by Typhoon Ondoy.

See also
List of programs broadcast by ABS-CBN
List of ABS-CBN drama series

References

ABS-CBN drama series
Philippine romance television series
Philippine drama television series
2009 Philippine television series debuts
2009 Philippine television series endings
Television series by Star Creatives
Philippine television series based on South Korean television series
Television shows set in the Philippines
Television shows set in Paris
Filipino-language television shows